Leendert Cornelis "Leen" van Dijke (born 3 September 1955) is a retired Dutch politician of the defunct Reformatory Political Federation (RPF) party and later co-founder of the Christian Union (CU) party and management consultant.

As a member of the Reformatory Political Federation (Reformatorische Politieke Federatie) and its successor the ChristianUnion (ChristenUnie) he was a member of the Dutch House of Representatives from 1994 to 2003 as well as Parliamentary leader from 1994 to 2002. He was also a member of the provincial parliament of the province of Zeeland from 1987 to 1994.

References

External links

Official
  L.C. (Leen) van Dijke Parlement & Politiek

|-

|-

1955 births
Living people
Christian Union (Netherlands) politicians
Dutch Calvinist and Reformed Christians
Dutch carpenters
Dutch management consultants
Dutch political party founders
Dutch public relations people
Leaders of political parties in the Netherlands
Members of the House of Representatives (Netherlands)
Members of the Provincial Council of Zeeland
People from Middelburg, Zeeland
People from Schouwen-Duiveland
Reformatory Political Federation politicians
20th-century Dutch politicians
21st-century Dutch civil servants
21st-century Dutch politicians